Pine River is a census-designated place in Waushara County, Wisconsin, United States. The community is located at the intersection of County H and County E, in the town of Leon. As of the 2010 census, its population is 147.

Notable people
 Alanson M. Kimball, Wisconsin politician

See also
 List of census-designated places in Wisconsin

References

External links

Census-designated places in Waushara County, Wisconsin
Census-designated places in Wisconsin